Cousin Phillis (1863–1864) is a novel by Elizabeth Gaskell. It was first published in four parts in The Cornhill Magazine, though a fifth and sixth part were planned. Later it was published in book form, including an edition in 1908 with illustrations by Mary Wheelhouse.  The story is about 19-year-old Paul Manning, who moves to the country and befriends his mother's family and his (second) cousin Phillis Holman, who is confused by her own placement at the edge of adolescence.

Most critics agree that Cousin Phillis is Gaskell's crowning achievement in the short novel. The story is uncomplicated; its virtues are in the manner of its development and telling. Cousin Phillis is also recognized as a fitting prelude for Gaskell's final and most widely acclaimed novel, Wives and Daughters, which ran in Cornhill Magazine from August 1864 to January 1866.

In 1982 a BBC television adaptation Cousin Phillis starring Anne-Louise Lambert, Tim Woodward and Ian Bannen.

Characters
 Paul Manning (the narrator, Phillis's cousin)
 Mr Manning (Paul's father and inventor)
 Mr Edward Holdsworth (railway engineer)
 Mr Holman (independent church minister and farmer)
 Mrs Holman
 Miss Phillis Holman
 Mr Ellison (Mr Manning's business partner)
 Miss Lucille Ventadur (at last Mr Holdsworth's wife)
 Betty (the servant at Holman house)

References

Notes

External links

1864 short stories
Short stories by Elizabeth Gaskell